Turku City Office is located in Turku, Finland and is supervised by the Mayor. Its tasks include preparing the decisions of the City Council, and the City Board and its subdivisions, as well as the implementation of these decisions. The City Office also aids the Mayor in directing the administration of the City, in directing finances, and with matters concerning personnel and outside relations. The City Office also aids the Deputy Mayors in the management of their respective tasks, and takes care of centralised services determined by the City Board.

Until the end of 2011 the city offices were located in an Art Nouveau-style building completed in 1909, originally an apartment building by the river Aura. In 2010 the building was sold by the city to a group of investors. Their plan is to refurbish it back into an apartment building.

References

External links 
City Administration 

Buildings and structures in Turku
National Romantic architecture in Finland
Art Nouveau government buildings
Government buildings completed in 1909